Ireland selected their Junior Eurovision Song Contest 2015 entry through Junior Eurovision Éire. The competing songs were broken down into four semi-finals.
On 23 March 2015 it was announced that Ireland would debut at the Junior Eurovision Song Contest 2015.

Junior Eurovision Éire was won by Aimee Banks, who sang "Réalta na mara" for Ireland at the contest. She placed 12th with 36 points.

Before Junior Eurovision

Junior Eurovision Éire 
The jury members in the first edition of Junior Eurovision Éire were Stiofán Ó Fearail (singer, songwriter, musician and television presenter), Niamh Kavanagh (singer, Eurovision Song Contest 1993 winner), and Brian Kennedy (singer, Irish representative in the Eurovision Song Contest 2006).

Semi-final 1

Semi-final 2

Semi-final 3

Semi-final 4

Final
Along with the winners from the four heats, two wildcard acts were entered into the final. They were Lisa-Rose McMahon who came second in week 1 and Aislí Moran who came second in week 3. For the final, a sing-off was introduced between the top two contenders.

Artist and song information

Aimee Banks
Aimee Banks (born 14 February 2002) is a young soprano from Moycullen, in County Galway. She represented Ireland in the Junior Eurovision Song Contest 2015 with "Réalta na Mara", (lit. Star of the sea), a song which she co-wrote and composed with Niall Mooney, Jonas Gladnikoff and Brendan McCarthy.

After Junior Eurovision, Banks went on to perform at competitions and other events not only in Ireland, but other countries like the United Kingdom and the United States. Banks won the International Vocal Competition "American Protege" and preceded to perform at Weill Recital Hall on 19 December. She secured eight National Titles at Ireland's Classical Festival Feis Ceoil 2015 and was also awarded Overall Vocalist Award and Bursary 2015 for Midlands Feis Ceoil. She had recorded her debut album My Classical Spirit and donated the proceeds to "Laura Lynn Children’s Hospice". In 2016 to high acclaim she debuted in her first opera as the young Giordano Bruno in Roger Doyle's first electronic opera Heresy, with commendations from Opera Now, The Irish Times, and 'Opera Today'.

Banks is currently studying a Bachelor in Music Performance at The Royal Irish Academy of Music under the direction of Professor Kathleen Tynan Head of Vocal Studies and Opera.

Réalta na Mara

"Réalta na Mara" is a song performed by Aimee Banks, which represented Ireland in the Junior Eurovision Song Contest 2015, placing 12th in a field of 17 countries.

At Junior Eurovision

At the running order draw which took place on 15 November 2015, Ireland were drawn to perform seventh on 21 November 2015, following  and preceding .

Final
The staging consisted of a deep purple background with a multitude of stars. The 'star of the sea' also appeared in bright light towards the end of the song.
The other important notice was that the waves in the sea behind Aimee were less rough, becoming as the song progressed to match with the lyrics. The stage for the performance was covered in dry ice, giving a mystical effect to the performance.

At the end of the voting, Ireland finished 12th with 36 points.

Voting
The voting during the final consisted of 50 percent public televoting and 50 percent from a jury deliberation. The jury consisted of five music industry professionals who were citizens of the country they represent, with their names published before the contest to ensure transparency. This jury was asked to judge each contestant based on: vocal capacity; the stage performance; the song's composition and originality; and the overall impression by the act. In addition, no member of a national jury could be related in any way to any of the competing acts in such a way that they cannot vote impartially and independently. The individual rankings of each jury member were released one month after the final.

Following the release of the full split voting by the EBU after the conclusion of the competition, it was revealed that Ireland had placed 10th with the public televote and 14th with the jury vote. In the public vote, Ireland scored 43 points, while with the jury vote, Ireland scored 19 points.

Below is a breakdown of points awarded to Ireland and awarded by Ireland in the final and the breakdown of the jury voting and televoting conducted during the final.

Detailed voting results
The following members comprised the Irish jury:
 Caitríona Ní Cheannabáin
 Gearóid Ó Murchú
 Aoife Scott
 Morgan Cooke
 Keith Ó Briain

Notes

References

Junior Eurovision Song Contest
Ireland
2015